Jo Eggen (born 26 April 1952) is a Norwegian poet. He made his literary début in 1980 with the poetry collection Ting og tings skygger, for which he was awarded the Tarjei Vesaas' debutantpris. He published the collection Stavkirkedikt in 2010.

References

1952 births
20th-century Norwegian poets
Norwegian male poets
Living people
21st-century Norwegian poets
20th-century Norwegian male writers
21st-century Norwegian male writers